The 2005–06 Women's National Cricket League season was the 10th season of the Women's National Cricket League, the women's domestic limited overs cricket competition in Australia. The tournament started on 5 November 2005 and finished on 5 February 2006. Defending champions Victorian Spirit finished fourth after winning only two games. New South Wales Breakers won the tournament for the eighth time after topping the ladder at the conclusion of the group stage and beating Queensland Fire by two games to one in the finals series.

Ladder

Fixtures

1st final

2nd final

3rd final

Statistics

Highest totals

Most runs

Most wickets

References

External links
 Series home at ESPNcricinfo

 
Women's National Cricket League seasons
 
Women's National Cricket League